Wolfe House may refer to:

in the United States
(by state, then city/town)
John Wolfe House, Colorado Springs, Colorado, listed on the National Register of Historic Places (NRHP) in El Paso County
Johnson-Wolfe Farm, Comus, Maryland, listed on the NRHP in Montgomery County
James K.P. Wolfe House, Frederick, Maryland, listed on the NRHP in Frederick County
Wolfe House (Terry, Mississippi), listed on the NRHP in Hinds County
Thomas Wolfe House, Asheville, North Carolina, listed on the NRHP in Buncombe County
Mary A. Wolfe House, Cincinnati, Ohio, listed on the NRHP in Hamilton County

See also
Wolf House (disambiguation)
Wolfe Ranch Historical District Moab, Utah, NRHP-listed